Rosskeen is a parish in Ross and Cromarty on the Cromarty Firth in northern Scotland, containing the settlements of Invergordon, Bridgend and Saltburn. It lies on the A9 between Inverness and Thurso.

Notable Buildings

Newmore Farmhouse (1845) by Andrew Maitland
Rosskeen Parish Church (1833) under threat of demolition since 1972
Rosskeen Free Church (c.1870)

Invergordon Castle was formerly the principal residence but was demolished in 1928.

Notable Features

The Rosskeen Stone, a prehistoric standing stone.

The highest hill in the parish is Cairn Coinneag, around 1000m high. The parish contains two rivers: Balnagowan (Rorie) and the Alness.

Notable Persons
Rev David Carment parish minister 1822 to 1843 and founder of Rosskeen Free Church of which he was minister 1843 to 1856
Very Rev John MacDonald (1860-1947) Moderator of the General Assembly of the Free Church of Scotland in 1915.

References

Populated places in Ross and Cromarty
Parishes in Ross and Cromarty